Pitti, also known as Pakshipitti (pakshi meaning "bird" in Malayalam, Telugu and Tamil), is an uninhabited coral islet in the Union Territory of Lakshadweep, India.

Geography
It is located at  about 24 km to the north of Kavaratti, 37 km to the east of Agatti and 42.5 km to the south-southwest of Amini Island. The island is low and arid and, lacking adequate anchorage points, of difficult accessibility. There is another island with the same name in Lakshadweep which is part of the Kalpeni Atoll.

Pitti Island is 300 × 200 m and devoid of vegetation. There is a dark rock on the eastern side and several stone cairns.

Ecology
Pitti is an important nesting place for  pelagic birds such as the sooty tern (Sterna fuliginosa), the greater crested tern (Sterna bergii) and the brown noddy (Anous stolidus). The birds nest side by side, but not intermixed, on the dry coral rubble. There is a seasonal pattern in the breeding period of the birds. Since it has no protecting reef surrounding it, the islet is periodically rinsed by wave action and there is no accumulation of guano on it.

Pitti Bank
Pitti is located at the southern end of Pitti Bank, a largely submerged atoll, on the same bank as Amini Island. Pitti Bank, also oriented along a northeast–southwest axis, is 49 km long, in the northern part from 2 to 7 km wide and in the southern part up to 18 km wide. The 11th parallel north passes across the bank.

Administration
The island belongs to the township of Kavaratti Island of Kavaratti tehsil.

References

Mondreti, R., Davidar, P. & Grémillet, D. (2018). "Illegal egg harvesting and population decline in a key pelagic seabird colony of the Eastern Indian Ocean". Marine Ornithology. 46: 103–107.

External links
Hydrographic Description (Indian Ocean Pilot)
Lagoon sizes
List of Atolls
An ornithological expedition to the Lakshadweep archipelago
Sources towards a history of the Laccadive Islands

Islands of Lakshadweep
Atolls of India
Important Bird Areas of Lakshadweep
Uninhabited islands of India